Iulia Constantia Zilil (called later Arzeila) was an ancient Roman-Berber city in Dchar Jdid, located 40 km southwest of Tangier and 13 km northeast of Asilah. It was one of the three colonias in Mauretania Tingitana (in northern Morocco) founded by emperor Augustus between 33 and 25 BC for veterans of the battle of Actium.

History
Iulia Constantia Zilil was originally one of many western Berber towns in the province of Mauretania Tingitana. It had then already been a Phoenician and Mauretanian settlement since the 4th century BC. The city was an important station on the Antonine Itinerary. It was located at approximately 40 km south-west of Tangier, 13 km in the north-east of Asilah, close to the present village of Dshar Jdid.

In the second half of 2nd century AD, the city was surrounded by an enclosure. It comprised residential districts, a big temple and an amphitheater, outside of the city a thermal unit (built in 80 AD) and a cistern with four compartments, supplied with a partly underground aqueduct (built in 130 AD).

The most spectacular monument in Iulia Constantia was that of the early Church of Iulia Constantia Zilil. Featuring three naves, it was equipped with a baptistery and various appendices close to the western door. This old church is the only one found in Atlantic Morocco, and was related to Christian adherence among Romanised Berbers.

The city was finally destroyed during the years 410-430 AD, at the time of the invasion of Mauretania Tingitana by Vandal tribes. But evidences show that the city remained populated as a small fishing village until the Arab invasion in the early 8th century.

Notes

Sources
Eliane Lenoir, "Fouilles de Dchar Jedid", 1977–1980, B.A.M.,XIV, 1981–1982, p. 169-225. (Akerraz et alii).
Eliane Lenoir, "La ville romaine de Zilil du Ier av IVe siècle ap. J.-C., dans L’afrique romaine, Iersiècle  av. J.-C - début Ve siècle ap. J.-C., colloque de la SOPHAU", Pallas, 68, 2005, p. 65-76.

See also

 Church of Iulia Constantia Zilil
 Iulia Valentia Banasa
 Iulia Campestris Babba
 Lixus
 Tingis
 Roman roads in Morocco

External Links 

 Images of Zilil in Manar al-Athar digital image resource archive

Archaeological sites in Morocco
Geography of Tanger-Tetouan-Al Hoceima
Roman towns and cities in Morocco
Coloniae (Roman)
Mauretania Tingitana
Phoenician colonies in Morocco
Populated places established in the 1st century BC
5th-century disestablishments
1st-century BC establishments
Roman towns and cities in Mauretania Tingitana